The Kaibab Indian Reservation is the home of the Kaibab Band of Paiute Indians (Southern Paiute Language: Kai'vi'vits), a federally recognized tribe of Southern Paiutes. The Indian reservation is located in northern part of the U.S. state of Arizona. The Pipe Spring National Monument lies in the southwestern section of the reservation. The Thunder Mountain Pootseev Dark-sky preserve is colocated with the reservation.

As of the 2000 census, its population was 196.

History

Geography

Demographics
As of the census of 2000, there were 196 people, 65 households, and 49 families residing on the reservation. The racial makeup of the reservation was 23.5% White, 66.8% Native American, 4.6% from other races, and 5.1% from two or more races, with no persons identifying as Black or African American, Asian, or Pacific Islander. 10.2% of the population were Hispanic or Latino of any race.

There were 65 households, out of which 61.5% had children under the age of 18 living with them, 36.9% were married couples living together, 32.3% had a female householder with no husband present, and 24.6% were non-families. 23.1% of all households were made up of individuals, and 1.5% had someone living alone who was 65 years of age or older. The average household size was 3.02 and the average family size was 3.49.

On the reservation the population was spread out, with 44.4% under the age of 18, 9.7% from 18 to 24, 24.5% from 25 to 44, 19.9% from 45 to 64, and 1.5% who were 65 years of age or older. The median age was 22 years. For every 100 females there were 73.45 males. For every 100 females age 18 and over, there were 75.81 males.

The median income for a household on the reservation was $20,000, and the median income for a family was $21,250. Males had a median income of $22,000 versus $16,607 for females. The per capita income for the reservation was $7,951. About 29.69% of families and 31.65% of the population were below the poverty line.

Education
The reservation is served by the Fredonia-Moccasin Unified School District.

References

External links

 Kaibab Band of Paiute Indians of the Kaibab Indian Reservation, official website
 Community Profile

American Indian reservations in Arizona
Federally recognized tribes in the United States
Native American tribes in Arizona
Southern Paiute
Geography of Coconino County, Arizona
Geography of Mohave County, Arizona